win32-loader (officially Debian-Installer Loader ) is a component of the Debian Linux distribution that runs on Windows and has the ability to load the actual Debian installer either from the network (as in the version in an official website) or from CD-ROM media (as in the version included in Jessie CD images).

win32-loader was born as an independent project, for which only the network version was available. Later the code went through a long review and polishing process to become part of the official Debian distribution.

Influences 
win32-loader strongly relies on projects such as NSIS, GRUB 2, loadlin and Debian-Installer to perform its task.  Additionally, it has drawn inspiration and ideas from similar projects such as Wubi and Instlux.

Features 
 Auto-detects 64-bit (x86-64) support in host CPUs, and automatically selects the x86-64 flavor of Debian whenever supported, completely transparent to the user.
 Detects a number of settings from the Windows environment (time zone, proxy settings, etc.) and feeds them to the Debian Installer via a "preseeding" mechanism so that the user doesn't have to select them.
 Translated to 51 languages. The selected language is displayed for user interaction since the first template, and is seamlessly passed on to the Debian Installer via "preseeding".

Similar projects

 Topologilinux: uses coLinux to run on Windows.
 Instlux, included on openSUSE since the 10.3 release.
 Wubi
 UNetbootin

See also 

 NSIS
 UNetbootin

References

External links
Package description in Debian
The network version homepage
The network version (exe)
The network version (README)

Free system software
Linux installation software
Windows-only free software